Arlow Burdette Stout (March 10, 1876 – October 12, 1957) was an American botanist and the pioneer breeder of the modern hybrid daylily.

Stout was born in Jackson Center, Ohio on March 10, 1876 and moved to Albion, Wisconsin as a child. He worked between 1911 and 1948 at the New York Botanical Garden. In over 50,000 cross-pollination experiments, Stout produced over one hundred viable Hemerocallis hybrids, revolutionizing nursery breeding and popular interest in daylilies. Without a doubt, Stout's public renown rested largely on the knowledge and innovation he brought to the breeding of daylilies. He died at his home in Pleasantville, New York in 1957.

In 1950, American Hemerocallis Society established an annual Stout Award in his honor.

Affiliations
 Honorary Life Member of the Horticultural Society of New York
 Honorary Life Fellow in the Royal Horticultural Society
 fellow of the American Association for the Advancement of Science
 fellow the American Society of Naturalists
 fellow of the Botanical Society of America

Awards
 1937: Thomas Roland Medal of the Massachusetts Horticultural Society; gold medal for an exhibit of seedling daylilies by the Horticultural Society of New York
 1954: Distinguished Service Award for "outstanding contributions to the advancement of horticulture and botany." from New York Botanical Garden

References

External links
 Arlow Burdette Stout Records (1899-1956), Archives and Manuscript Collections, New York Botanical Garden

1876 births
1957 deaths
People from Shelby County, Ohio
People from Albion, Dane County, Wisconsin
New York Botanical Garden
American botanists